Bohang Township (Mandarin: 波航乡) is a township in Huangyuan County, Xining, Qinghai, China. In 2010, Bohang Township had a total population of 8,478: 4,481 males and 3,997 females: 1,487 aged under 14, 6,418 aged between 15 and 65 and 573 aged over 65.

References 

Township-level divisions of Qinghai
Xining